Karl H. Pribram (February 25, 1919 – January 19, 2015) was a professor at Georgetown University, in the United States, an emeritus professor of psychology and psychiatry at Stanford University and distinguished professor at Radford University. Board-certified as a neurosurgeon, Pribram did pioneering work on the definition of the limbic system, the relationship of the frontal cortex to the limbic system, the sensory-specific "association" cortex of the parietal and temporal lobes, and the classical motor cortex of the human brain. He worked with Karl Lashley at the Yerkes Primate Center of which he was to become director later. He was professor at Yale University for ten years and at Stanford University for thirty years.

To the general public, Pribram is best known for his development of the holonomic brain model of cognitive function and his contribution to ongoing neurological research into memory, emotion, motivation and consciousness. He was married to American author Katherine Neville.

Holonomic model 

Pribram's holonomic model of brain processing is described in his 1991 Brain and Perception, which contains the extension of his work with David Bohm. It states that, in addition to the circuitry accomplished by the large fiber tracts in the brain, processing also occurs in webs of fine fiber branches (for instance, dendrites) that form webs, as well as in the dynamic electrical fields that surround these dendritic "trees". In addition, the processing occurring around these dendritic trees can influence that occurring in those trees of nearby neurons whose dendrites are entangled but not in direct contact (known as ephaptic signaling).  In this way, processing in the brain can occur in a non-localized manner. This type of processing is properly described by Dennis Gabor, the inventor of hologram, as quanta of information he called a "holon", an energy-based concept of information. These wavelets are used in quantum holography, the basis of MRI, PET scans and other image processing procedures .

Gabor wavelets are windowed Fourier transforms that convert complex spatial (and temporal) patterns into component waves whose amplitudes at their intersections become reinforced or diminished . Fourier processes are the basis of holography. Holograms can
correlate and store a huge amount of information – and have the advantage that the inverse transform returns the results of correlation into the spatial and temporal patterns that guide us in navigating our universe.

David Bohm had suggested that were we to view the cosmos without the lenses that outfit our telescopes, the universe would appear to us as a hologram. Pribram extended this insight by noting that were we deprived of the lenses of our eyes and the lens-like processes of our other sensory receptors, we would be immersed in holographic experiences.

Other contributions 
In the late 1940s and early 1950s, Pribram's neurobehavioral experiments established the composition of the limbic system and the executive functions of the prefrontal cortex. Pribram also discovered the sensory specific systems of the association cortex, and showed that these systems operate to organize the choices we make among sensory stimuli, not the sensing of the stimuli themselves.

His account of how his discoveries were made is in his book The Form Within which was published in 2013. It includes stories of his encounters with leading scientists and scholars of the day, and amusing stories like how he lost part of a finger when his hand was slammed down by the chimpanzee Washoe at the University of Oklahoma.

In 1999, he was the inaugural winner of the Dagmar and Václav Havel Award for uniting the sciences and the humanities. He died in 2015 in Virginia, aged 95.

Stanford assault case 
In 1975, Stanford University put Pribram on two years probation and lowered his salary following a university investigation into an alleged assault and other mistreatment of Barbara Honegger.

Bibliography
 
 DeVore, Steven; Pribram, Karl (1985)  The Neuropsychology of Achievement. Pleasanton, CA, SyberVision Systems. ASIN: B000M6COW4
 
 
 
Joye, S.R. (2017). The Little Book of Consciousness: Pribram's Holonomic Brain Theory and Bohm's Implicate Order, The Viola Institute,

References

External links
 "Comparison between Holographic Brain Theory and conventional models of neuronal computation" – academic paper on Pribram's work
 "Pribram Receives Havel Prize For His Work in Neuroscience" – news article
 "Winner 1998 Noetic Medal for Consciousness & Brain Research –  For Lifetime Achievement"
 Global Lens Interview (Video)
 The implicate brain by Karl H. Pribram, karlhpribram.com
 Karl's Website karlhpribram.com

American cognitive neuroscientists
Austrian neuroscientists
Austrian emigrants to the United States
American consciousness researchers and theorists
Fellows of the American Academy of Arts and Sciences
Georgetown University faculty
George Mason University faculty
Radford University faculty
Yale University faculty
American neurosurgeons
Quantum mind
Stanford University Department of Psychology faculty
Scientists from Vienna
1919 births
2015 deaths
Stanford University School of Medicine faculty